P. J. McIntyre was a dual player from Kenmare, County Kerry. He played both football and hurling at inter-county and club level in Kerry during the 1960s and 1970s. He also played with Offaly and St Rynagh's.

He won a Munster Junior Football Championship title and later added an All-Ireland Junior Football Championship with Kerry in 1967 and a Munster Intermediate Hurling Championship in 1970.

His son Seamus followed in his father's footsteps in both sport and professional life by joining the Garda Síochána; he died in an accident in Cork City in 2001.

References
 https://web.archive.org/web/20100817034410/http://munster.gaa.ie/history/ih_teams/
 https://web.archive.org/web/20110801225940/http://munster.gaa.ie/history/jf_teams/
 http://hoganstand.com/kerry/ArticleForm.aspx?ID=13395
 https://web.archive.org/web/20170729092004/http://hoganstand.com/Kerry/Profile.aspx

Dual players
Austin Stacks hurlers
Kerry inter-county Gaelic footballers
Kerry inter-county hurlers
Kenmare Gaelic footballers
Kenmare hurlers
Kilgarvan hurlers
Offaly hurlers
St Rynagh's hurlers
Garda Síochána officers